Sveigðir, Sveigder or Swegde (Old Norse "Waving One") was a Swedish king of the House of Yngling in Norse mythology. He was the son of Fjölner, whom he succeeded as king, and he married Vana of Vanaheimr, probably one of the Vanir. Lured by a dwarf, Sveigðir disappeared into a stone and never came back. He was succeeded by his son Vanlandi.

Attestations
Snorri Sturluson wrote of Sveigðir in his Ynglinga saga (1225):

Snorri also quoted some lines from Ynglingatal composed in the 9th century:

The Historia Norwegiæ presents a Latin summary of Ynglingatal written in the late 12th century and consequently older than Snorri's quotation:

The even earlier source Íslendingabók from the early 12th century, cites the line of descent in Ynglingatal and also gives Svegðir as the successor of Fjölnir and the predecessor of Vanlandi: iiii Fjölnir. sá er dó at Friðfróða. v Svegðir. vi Vanlandi.

Notes

References
McKinnell, John (2005). Meeting the Other in Norse Myth and Legend. DS Brewer.

Sources
Ynglingatal
Ynglinga saga (part of the Heimskringla)
Historia Norwegiae

Mythological kings of Sweden